Boston RFC may refer to:

 Boston RFC (England), a rugby union club from Boston, Lincolnshire
 Boston RFC (United States), a rugby union team based in Boston, Massachusetts